The bull ring in La Línea de la Concepción, a town in the province of Cádiz at the southern edge of Spain, close to the British territory of Gibraltar, was opened in 1883.

history

The bull ring is said to be unusual in that it has an odd number of sides. With 49 sides it is however nearly circular and it also has eleven entrances. The building was designed by Adolfo del Castillo and built on the Plaza de Arenal. It is now one of the oldest buildings in the town. The bull ring was built between 1880 and 1883 in a typical Andalusian style just thirteen years after the municipality was established. The bull ring is said to be a centre for meeting people including those from the nearby peninsula of Gibraltar. This may account for its original capacity being 6,000 people despite the town's population only being 5,000 at the time.

The building was partially removed in the 1980s but is still listed as being of special interest by the Spanish Government.

In its early days the ring saw a ballooning show by the Montgolfier brothers in 1894.

Bullfights mark the end of the Feria de la Línea which is celebrated in mid-July and in recent times is the only time that a bullfight occurs.

References

1883 establishments in Spain
Bullrings in Spain
La Línea de la Concepción
Bien de Interés Cultural landmarks in the Province of Cádiz